Gertrud Kristina Blixt-Sigurdsen, née Blixt, (11 January 1923 – 27 March 2015) was a Swedish Social Democratic politician and Member of Parliament, who served as Minister of Social Affairs from 1985 to 1989.

Sigurdsen started her political career as ombudsman in the Swedish Trade Union Confederation in 1949. On 3 November 1973 she was made Minister of Aid within the Ministry for Foreign Affairs in the cabinet of Olof Palme. She held the office until the Social Democrats lost the election in 1976. When Olof Palme and the Social Democratic party came to power again on 8 October 1982, she was made Minister of Healthcare within the Ministry of Social Affairs. In 1985 she succeeded Sten Andersson as Minister of Social Affairs and was made head of her own ministry. She was a member of the Swedish parliament from 1969 to 1991 and  a member of the executive committee of the Social Democratic party from 1968 to 1990.

Sigurdsen was born in the small village of Nävekvarn, near Nyköping, as the daughter of the tractor operator Arvid Blixt and his wife Cecilia, née Karlsson. She was married to the Norwegian Rolf Sigurdsen (1922–1972) between 1953 and 1960; together they had two sons Odd (born 1954) and Björn (born 1956).

References

Further reading
 
 Obituary

20th-century Swedish women politicians
1923 births
2015 deaths
Members of the Andra kammaren
Swedish Ministers for Health
Swedish Ministers for International Development Cooperation
Swedish Ministers for Social Affairs
21st-century Swedish women politicians
Women government ministers of Sweden
Women members of the Riksdag
Members of the Riksdag from the Social Democrats